Only Lonely Sometimes is the twenty-first studio album by American country music singer-songwriter Tammy Wynette. It was released on June 9, 1980, by Epic Records.

Commercial performance 
The album peaked at No. 37 on the Billboard Country Albums chart. The album's first single, "He Was There (When I Needed You)", peaked at No. 17 on the Billboard Country Singles chart, and the album's second single, "Starting Over", also peaked at No. 17.

Track listing

Personnel
Adapted from the album liner notes.
Phil Baugh - lead guitar
Ken Bell - rhythm guitar
Lou Bradley - engineer
Tom Brannon - background vocals
Jimmy Capps - rhythm guitar
Jerry Carrigan - drums
Boomer Castleman - rhythm guitar
C.C. Couch - background vocals
Mike Daniel - engineer
Chalmers Davis - keyboard
Diane Davidson - background vocals
Pete Drake - steel guitar
Jimmy English - lead guitar
Ralph Ezell - bass
Johnny Gimble - fiddle
Owen Hale - drums
Kenny Malone - drums
Bill McElhiney - string arrangements
Steve Nathan - keyboard
Nightstreets - background vocals 
June Page - background vocals
Ron Reynolds - engineer
George Richey - keyboard
Hargus "Pig" Robbins - keyboard
Norman Seeff - photography
The Shelly Kurland Strings - strings
Billy Sherrill - producer
Henry Strzelecki - bass
Virginia Team - art direction
Pete Wade - rhythm guitar
Tammy Wynette - lead vocals
Reggie Young - lead guitar

Chart positions

Album

Singles

References

1980 albums
Tammy Wynette albums
Epic Records albums
Albums produced by Billy Sherrill